Typhoon Bopha, known in the Philippines as Typhoon Pablo, was the strongest tropical cyclone on record to ever affect the southern Philippine island of Mindanao, making landfall as a Category 5 super typhoon with winds of 175 mph (280 km/h). The twenty-fourth tropical storm, along with being the fourth and final super typhoon of the 2012 Pacific Typhoon season, Bopha originated unusually close to the equator, becoming the second-most southerly Category 5 super typhoon, reaching a minimum latitude of 7.4°N on December 3, 2012, as only Typhoon Louise-Marge of 1964 came closer to the equator at this strength, at 7.3°N. After first making landfall in Palau, where it destroyed houses, disrupted communications and caused power outages, flooding and uprooted trees, Bopha made landfall late on December 3 on the island of Mindanao. The storm caused widespread destruction on Mindanao, leaving thousands of people homeless and killing 1901 people.

After hitting Davao Oriental and Davao de Oro provinces, Bopha shifted through the southern and central regions of Mindanao, cutting power to two provinces and triggering landslides. More than 170,000 people fled to evacuation centers, as the system moved to the South China Sea west of the Palawan island province, eventually dissipating on December 9.

Meteorological history

On November 23, 2012, a large area of convection lingered 650 km (400 mi) south of Pohnpei, near the equator at a latitude of 0.6ºN. The system had a poorly defined, elongated atmospheric circulation and was located in an area of moderate wind shear and restricted outflow, due to a subtropical ridge to the north. As a result, the Joint Typhoon Warning Center (JTWC) assessed a low chance for tropical cyclogenesis. The center slowly consolidated, with a well-defined mid-level center. Late on November 25, the JTWC issued a tropical cyclone formation alert after it organized further, noting that the system had developed an anticyclone which was providing outflow. Around the same time, the Japan Meteorological Agency (JMA) classified the system as a tropical depression, about 410 km (255 mi) south-southwest of Pohnpei. At 2100 UTC on November 25, the JTWC too upgraded the system to Tropical Depression 26W.

Upon developing, a depression had deep convection located in rainbands around the increasingly consolidating center; however, the center initially was difficult to locate. With minimal wind shear and overall favorable conditions, the system was expected to gradually intensify as it moved generally westward, steered by the ridge to the north. On November 26, the movement became nearly stationary as the center organized further. Later that day, the JMA upgraded the depression to Tropical Storm Bopha (1224), and early on November 27 the JTWC followed suit after a strong burst of thunderstorms over the center. Its westward motion increased on November 28, later becoming west-southwestward. The convection gradually became better organized and wrapped into the center, indicative of a strengthening storm. However, early on November 29 the appearance degraded, with the thunderstorms limited to the southern periphery due to reduced outflow to the south. The circulation became exposed, and the JTWC noted that Bopha was unable to intensify significantly due to its low latitude and correspondingly low Coriolis effect. Late on November 29, convection increased, aided by warm waters and low wind shear. At 0000 UTC on November 30, the JMA upgraded Bopha to a severe tropical storm. A few hours later, the JTWC upgraded the storm to a typhoon, and the JMA followed suit at 1800 UTC that day. At that time, Bopha was located about 980 km (610 mi) east-southeast of Palau.

As the system continued to intensify, organized bands of thunderstorms began to develop rapidly around the system, mostly on the western half of the storm.  They later merged with Bopha, which led to the system's increase in size. Several hot towers also began to rise up near the low level circulation center, with one of the hot towers reaching  into the atmosphere. At around the same time, on November 30, a ragged, eye-like feature appeared in microwave imagery, which later transitioned into a pinhole eye by December 1. 

 Early on December 3, due to the eye wall replacement cycle, the system weakened slightly into a Category 3 typhoon; however, a few hours later, as the eyewall replacement cycle ended, Bopha reintensified into a Category 4 typhoon, while the eye became well-defined again. Late on December 3, as the system continued to strengthen, the system rapidly intensified into a Category 5 super typhoon, deepening to an unofficial pressure of 918 mbar (hPa) (27.11 inHg) as stated by the JTWC at peak intensity, 

At 2100 UTC on December 3 (0500 December 4 local time), Bopha made landfall over Baganga, Davao Oriental, as a Category 5 super typhoon, and the eye dissipated just an hour after landfall. Bopha began to weaken, with convection on the eastern side of the storm decreasing as it moved through the Sulu Sea. It made landfall on the island of Palawan on December 5, before briefly weakening to a tropical storm on December 6. 

Late on December 7, Bopha's central dense overcast started to increase slightly, and the typhoon rapidly intensified from a Category 1 to a Category 4 typhoon in only six hours. Upon reintesifying, Bopha developed a well-defined eye that had deep convection near the center of the storm. On December 8, the system started to weaken due to increasing moderate wind shear. Late on December 8 into December 9, Bopha weakened rapidly from a typhoon to a tropical storm, with its convection being blown to the northeast by wind shear, exposing the low level circulation center. The remaining thin convection in the center consisted of few convective thunderstorms associated with stratocumulus clouds.

Preparations

Federated States of Micronesia and Palau

As Bopha was organizing, the National Weather Service (NWS) in Guam issued a tropical storm watch for the FSM islands of Nukuoro and Lukunor. The watch was upgraded to a tropical storm warning on November 26, and the watch was expanded to include Losap and Chuuk Lagoon. As Bopha moved westward, the office also issued a tropical storm watch for Poluwat, and Satawal, both of which were upgraded to warnings, and a typhoon watch was issued for Woleai.

The Palau National Emergency Management Office (NEMO) issued an announcement on November 29 requesting the public to stock up with emergency supplies such as food and water for three days, portable radios with spare batteries, flashlights, and first-aid kits. The citizens of Palau were also advised to secure loose objects that might be lifted up by the strong winds, board up windows, trim tree branches that could fall and damage homes, fill up vehicles with gas, secure boats and assist their communities in preparing.

Philippines

Initially, the National Disaster Risk Reduction and Management Council (NDRRMC) advised the citizens of Iligan and Cagayan de Oro to prepare for the impact of the storm, as they really  did not want a repeat of Severe Tropical Storm Washi, which had hit when people were asleep and, therefore, had caused a large number of deaths. On December 2, the NDRRMC put parts of the central and southeastern Philippines on high alert. Relief food and medicines had been pre-positioned while thousands of people along the country's eastern border were being prepared for evacuation to safer ground in preparation for the typhoon. With Bopha expected to strike Mindanao and Visayas, as well as areas in Southern Tagalog and Metro Manila, the possibility of landslides was advised in Surigao, Davao, Compostela Valley, Misamis, Bukidnon, Lanao del Norte, Lanao del Sur, Zamboanga, Leyte, Cebu, Bohol, Negros, Panay and Mindoro. "Keep updated on the bulletins from PAGASA. Always cooperate with the local authorities as the National Government is all ready to provide all assistance to those that may be affected," Valte said. Also, disaster authorities in Bicol were alerted and getting ready with their disaster contingency plan as the typhoon was closing in.On December 3, around 2,000 families living in Hinatuan, on the province of Surigao del Sur, were evacuated. Since schools would be turned into evacuation centers, Candelario Viola, the mayor of Hinatuan, ordered the suspension of all classes in the town. Mar Roxas, the Interior and Local Government Secretary, said that National Disaster Risk Reduction and Management Council’s disaster monitoring systems were set up in several regions across the Philippines. "In accordance with President Aquino’s marching orders to ensure zero casualties from disasters, as much as possible, I have ordered our regional directors to make sure that the necessary precautions are undertaken to mitigate the effects of Tropical Storm Bopha," he said. "We have our existing protocols, and it is just a matter of implementing them and making other necessary preparations as appropriate." Roxas added. As preparations continued, Storm signal number 1 was declared over Siquijor, Bohol, Biliran, Camotes Island, Cebu Southern Leyte, Leyte, Eastern Samar, Western Samar, Surigao del Norte, Siargao Island, Dinagat Island, Agusan del Norte, Agusan del Sur, rest of Davao Oriental, Davaol del Norte including Samal Island, Compostela Valley, Bukidnon, Misamis Occidental, Misamis oriental, Camiguin, Lanao del Norte and Lanao del Sur. Also, signal number 2 was raised over Surigao del Sur and the northern part of Davao Oriental. The national police, coast guard (PCG) and navy had placed their personnel on standby and their disaster-response units in preparation for Bopha's impact. "We are ready to conduct rescue operations in flooded areas. Let us warn operators of small vessels, motor bancas, and fishing boats to avoid sailing in the southeastern and eastern section of the country where the sea is rough," said PCG spokesman Commander Armand Balilo. After staying in the South China Sea for at least 4 days, "Pablo" again threatened the western sections of Northern Luzon, and by the afternoon of December 8, public storm warning signal number 2 was raised over 3 provinces, and 11 provinces were inside signal number 1. Forecasters said the storm had turned and is due to hit the Philippines on December 9.

Impact

Federated States of Micronesia and Palau

As Typhoon Bopha passed to the south of the island, power outages occurred across the island chain. Communication network disruptions delayed updates on damage assessments after the storm passed. Initial damage assessments in Koror indicated slight damage, with uprooted trees and power disruption. Outside of Koror, coastal villages were affected by strong winds and rain, which flooded outlying areas. Heavy rains flooded areas of Peleliu, and houses in Babeldaob were destroyed.

Philippines

December 4

Typhoon Bopha made landfall over Mindanao on December 4, destroying homes, cutting power and forcing the cancellation of flights and ferry services. There was only one confirmed death at that moment, but local media said people were injured by flying debris and falling trees.  Typhoon Bopha packed winds of up to 175 mph when it struck the island nation, bringing torrential rains that flattened entire villages, leaving thousands homeless, as well as washing out roads and bridges needed by rescue personnel trying to reach stricken regions.  The death toll from Bopha rose to 82 as rescuers attempted to reach areas cut off in flash floods and mudslides. There were 49 fatalities in a mudslide in the mountainous town of New Bataan alone, and another 33 died in rural settlements elsewhere in Mindanao. Joe Curry, the Philippines head of Catholic Relief Services, said, "Authorities seem more prepared to deal with this storm. So far there's been more preparedness efforts at this time, but I think we're going to see the damage [reports] come out later today and tomorrow." Flood waters “rampaged down a mountain, engulfing emergency shelters and washing away an army truck” the Associated Press (AP) reported. The typhoon had affected more than 213,000 people, demolished houses and stranded people in two provinces and parts of the Visayas region, according to a disaster agency. More than 179,000 people were in evacuation centers. School classes were suspended in many cities, and dozens of flights were cancelled, according to the national disaster agency. Nearly 5,000 travellers had been left stranded at ports across the country as of December 5 because of disruption to ferry services.

December 5
Lieutenant Colonel Lyndon Paniza of the army’s 10th Infantry Division, said fatalities from Compostela Valley had gone up to 142, 69 of whom were from a flash flood the previous day in New Bataan. "Electrical poles snapped like matchsticks as Bopha's devastating winds howled across the island of Mindanao, leaving large swaths of territory without power. It was the strongest weather disturbance to hit the south in two decades," the government said. Defense undersecretary Benito Ramos, who heads the national disaster and relief council, didn't give any financial estimate of the damage to agriculture and infrastructure caused by Bopha, saying estimates were still being collected. Arthur Uy, governor of the worst-hit province, Compostela Valley in Mindanao, said raging water and mud from the mountains had swept through school buildings, covered courts, town halls, and health centers where residents had taken shelter. The death toll in the province stood at 150. "The waters came so suddenly and unexpectedly, and the winds were so fierce; that compounded the loss of lives and livelihood," Uy told Reuters in a telephone interview. He said farm water catchment basins atop mountains had given way due to the torrential rains, sending down heavy volumes of water to the flatlands below. Damage to agriculture and infrastructure in Compostela Valley province could reach at least 4 billion pesos, equivalent to €75 million or $98 million U.S., with the typhoon destroying 70–80% of plantations, mostly bananas for export, Uy said. By the evening of December 5, 280 fatalities had been reported on the islands with hundreds missing, while rescuers were attempting to reach areas cut off by floods and mudslides.

December 6

The civil defense office said that at least 326 people had been confirmed dead and another 379 remained missing. In Compostela Valley province alone, at least 184 people died, many when flash floods had hit emergency shelters where they had taken refuge. Social Welfare Secretary Corazon Soliman said the government had sought help from the Swiss-based International Organization for Migration to build temporary shelters for Bopha survivors. President Benigno Aquino III sent navy ships with food and other supplies to 150,000 people on Mindanao's east coast, where three towns remained cut off by landslides and wrecked bridges. Officials said many of the Mindanao victims were poor migrants who had flocked by the thousands to mountainous, landslide-prone sites like the towns of New Bataan and Monkayo to work at unregulated small-scale gold mines. The International Federation of Red Cross and Red Crescent Societies issued an urgent appeal for $4.8 million to help people directly affected by the typhoon. "We had a problem of where to take the evacuees. All the evacuation centers have lost their roofs," Davao Oriental Gov. Corazon Nunez-Malanyaon said. Later that day, 475 were confirmed dead, and the government appealed for international help.

December 7
Due to the typhoon damage, Proclamation No.  522 signed by President Benigno Aquino III placed the Philippines under state of national calamity.

December 8
Nearly 600 fatalities have been confirmed, and hundreds are still missing as the storm has made a U-turn and threatens the country's northwest.

December 9
548 people are confirmed dead, and 827 are missing.

December 10

Philippines disaster chief says 647 deaths have been confirmed and is likely to rise. 780 people are still missing, including hundreds of fishermen. The storm has caused crop damage worth 8.5 billion pesos ($210 million).

December 13
The National Disaster Risk Reduction and Management Council placed the death toll from the typhoon at 902 and could reach a thousand as 635 remain missing. Of the dead, 567 have been identified. The NDRRMC said most of the reported deaths were in the badly hit provinces of Davao Oriental and Compostela Valley.

The NDRRMC said that 296 of the more than 300 missing tuna fishermen from General Santos have been rescued by Task Force Maritime Search and Rescue SarGen and to date, only 14 persons remain missing in General Santos. At least 80,000 people were left homeless.

December 15
The death toll reached 1,067 people, with most on the southern island of Mindanao, where floods and landslides caused major damage on December 4. A total of 834 people remain missing, about half of them are fishermen.

Retirement
Due to its high death toll and damage, the Philippine Atmospheric, Geophysical and Astronomical Services Administration (PAGASA) announced that the name Pablo was decommissioned and will no longer be used for tropical cyclones. In February 2013, PAGASA selected the name Pepito to replace Pablo for the 2016 season, but due to the limited number of typhoons in the season, the name was instead first used in the 2020 season.

In February 2013, the ESCAP/WMO Typhoon Committee announced that Bopha will also be retired from its naming lists and was replaced with the name Ampil. The name Ampil was first used in the 2018 season.

International aid and assistance

 

The European Commission provided Euro 10 million (₱543 million) for the victims of Typhoon Bopha, notably in the regions of Compostella Valley and Davao Oriental in Mindanao.

 

The Australian government provided A$7.3 million (₱307 million) for the victims of Typhoon Bopha which mostly affected Visayas and Mindanao earlier this month.

 
The Chinese government presented over US$200,000 in aid to the Department of Foreign Affairs of the Philippines. The Red Cross Society of China also donated US$30,000 to the Philippine Red Cross.

 

The Indonesian government gave US$1 million and 4 tons of relief goods to help the typhoon victims, coursing the assistance through the Armed Forces of the Philippines.

 

The Japanese government announced that it provided an additional $4.2 million emergency grant aid to the Philippines for the victims of Typhoon Pablo (Bopha).

 
Laos extended US$30,000 in aid to the victims of the typhoon

 
The Myanmar government donated US$50,000 in rehabilitation aid to the Philippines.

 

Sri Lanka gave US$25,000 in aid to the Philippines for the rebuilding of homes destroyed by the typhoon.

 
The Timor-Leste government extended US$750,000 in assistance to the victims of Typhoon Bopha.

See also

 List of Equatorial tropical cyclones
 Typhoon Kate (1970)
 Typhoon Tembin (2017)
 Typhoon Ike
 Tropical Storm Washi
 Typhoon Haiyan
Typhoon Louise-Marge - another powerful typhoon that struck Mindanao as a Category 5.
Typhoon Rai - a powerful typhoon that impacted similar areas as Bopha in 2021

Notes

References

External links

JMA General Information of Typhoon Bopha (1224) from Digital Typhoon
JMA Best Track Data of Typhoon Bopha (1224) 
JTWC Best Track Data of Super Typhoon 26W (Bopha)
26W.BOPHA from the U.S. Naval Research Laboratory
Humanitarian response information of Typhoon Bopha via ReliefWeb

2012 Pacific typhoon season
 December 2012 events in Asia
2012 disasters in the Philippines
Typhoons in the Federated States of Micronesia
Typhoons in Palau
Typhoons in the Philippines
Retired Pacific typhoons
Typhoons
Bopha